Molatedi Dam is an earth-fill type dam located on the Marico River, near Zeerust, North West, South Africa. It was established in 1986 and serves mainly for irrigation purposes and domestic supply. The hazard potential of the dam has been ranked high (3).

See also
List of reservoirs and dams in South Africa
List of rivers of South Africa

References 

 List of South African Dams from the Department of Water Affairs and Forestry (South Africa)

Dams in South Africa
Dams completed in 1986